Jean de Nostredame (1522–1576/7) was a Provençal historian and writer. He was the younger brother of Michel de Nostredame.

He was baptised at Saint-Rémy-de-Provence on 19 February 1522. He followed the footsteps of his father, Jaume de Nostredame, as a notary public and served as a procurator of the Cour de Parlement of Provence in Aix.

Nostredame's major work is Les vies des plus célèbres et anciens Poètes provensaux, qui ont floury du temps des comtes de Provence (Lyon: Alexandre Marsilij, 1575). It presents itself as a history of the troubadours. Today it is regarded as largely fantasy, though nuggets of historical truth remain. Nostredame lists three sources for his accounts, but none of these survive. In the eighteenth century Giovanni Mario Crescimbeni was influenced by Nostredame, but in the twentieth, Camille Chabaneau and Joseph Anglade showed definitively that most of Nostredame cannot be corroborated.

References
Boase, Roger (1977). The Origin and Meaning of Courtly Love: A Critical Study of European Scholarship. Manchester: Manchester University Press. .
Jean de Nostredame at Espace Nostradamus
« L’Hystoire de la guerre d’Arles. L’épisode de Tersin dans la Chronique de Provence de Jean de Nostredame (ca. 1575) », De la pensée de l’histoire au jeu littéraire. Études médiévales en l’honneur de Dominique Boutet, dir. S. Douchet, M.-P. Halary, P. Moran, S. Lefèvre, J.-R. Valette, Paris, Honoré Champion, 2019, p. 870-881.

1522 births
1570s deaths
People from Saint-Rémy-de-Provence
16th-century French historians
French male non-fiction writers
French people of Jewish descent